Daan Rosenmuller (born 15 July 1995) is a Dutch professional basketball player, who last played for BAL of the Dutch Basketball League (DBL).

Professional career
Rosenmuller started his professional career with BS Weert in the Dutch Basketball League (DBL) during the 2014–15 season. He averaged 9.3 points and 3.7 rebounds in 32.6 minutes per game, which earned him the DBL Rookie of the Year award.

On August 15, 2017, Rosenmuller was announced by BAL, the team which replaced BSW as team from Weert in the DBL.

References

1995 births
Living people
BSW (basketball club) players
Basketball Academie Limburg players
Dutch men's basketball players
Shooting guards
Sportspeople from Beverwijk